The Sierra Leone Football Association is the governing body of football in Sierra Leone. It was founded in 1960 (current association), and affiliated to FIFA the same year.
It organizes and runs the  national leagues, including the Sierra Leone National Premier League, Sierra Leonean FA Cup, and the national football teams, including the under-17, under-20, under-23, and the senior national team.  The Sierra Leone Football Association is formed of elected executive committee members, led by a president, who is currently Isha Johansen, who was elected in August 2013.

Executive committee members 
 Thomas Daddy Brima, president
 Brima Mazola Kamara, vice president
 Mohamed  Alie Kargbo, vice president
 Alhaji Nasiru-Deen, executive member
 Alie Badara Tarawallie, executive member

References

External links 
 Official site
 Football Sierra Leone 
 Sierra Leone at the FIFA website
   Sierra Leone at CAF Online
 https://web.archive.org/web/20130821103939/http://www.sierraexpressmedia.com/archives/59682

Sierra Leone
 Football in Sierra Leone
Football
 Sports organizations established in 1960